Timothy Brownell (born 12 July 1997 in Lebanon, New Hampshire) is an American professional squash player. As of June 2022, he was ranked number 64 in the world.

On June 17th 2022, he won the US Nationals, beating 2nd seed Todd Harrity in straight games. The previous day, in the semifinal, he overcame a two-game deficit to beat top seed Shahjahan Khan.

References

1997 births
Living people
American male squash players
21st-century American people